Haiti made its first appearance at the Olympic Games in the 1900 Summer Olympics in Paris. The 1924 Summer Olympics in the same city marked Haiti's first Olympic medal, when the seven members of Haiti's shooting team took third place in the free rifle competition. The next games, in 1928, saw another medal for Haiti; Silvio Cator took the silver in men's long jump. While Haiti has participated in several Olympic games since 1928, no other medals have been won. Haiti made their debut in the Winter Olympics in 2022.

Medal tables

Medals by Summer Games

Medals by Winter Games

Medals by sport

History by sport 

†Haiti had one weightlifter entered in the 1936 Olympics, but he did not compete.

List of medalists

Summary by sport

Fencing

Haiti's Olympic debut in 1900 consisted of two fencers. Through the 2016 Games, the nation has not won any medals in the sport.

See also
 List of flag bearers for Haiti at the Olympics
 Haiti at the Paralympics
 Tropical nations at the Winter Olympics

References

External links
 
 
 
 Olympics Official Reports